Voskhod (: sunrise) may refer to:
Voskhod programme, the Soviet programme of human spaceflight
Voskhod (spacecraft), a spacecraft used in the Voskhod programme
Voskhod (rocket), a rocket that was used to launch Voskhod spacecraft
Voskhod, Russia, several rural localities in Russia
Voskhod, Yalta Municipality, an urban-type settlement in Crimea, disputed between Ukraine and Russia
Voskhod motorcycle, a brand of motorcycle
Voskhod (hydrofoil), a class of hydrofoil boat built in Ukraine
Voskhod (magazine), a periodical published in 1881–1906 in the Russian Empire

See also 
Sunrise